Sallie McAllister Curb Arnold (September 12, 1880 – April 23, 1982) was an American artist.

Her work is included in the collections of the Smithsonian American Art Museum and the Birmingham Museum of Art.

References

1880 births
1982 deaths
20th-century American women artists
Artists from Alabama
Artists in the Smithsonian American Art Museum collection
People from Perry County, Alabama